State Route 293 (SR 293) is a  east-west state highway that, excluding its western terminus, is located entirely in Overton County, Tennessee.

Route description

SR 293 begins on the Overton-Putnam county line at an intersection with SR 136 north of Bangham. It heads east, in Overton County, along Tommy Dodson Highway (as it is signed in the field) though rural farmland for several miles to enter Rickman and come to an intersection with SR 111. SR 293 turns south along a short concurrency with SR 111 before turning southeast along Rickman Monterey Highway to pass through downtown, where it has an intersection with former SR 42. The highway then leaves Rickman and winds its way through farmland and rural areas for the next several miles before coming to an end at an intersection with SR 84. The entire route of SR 293 is a rural two-lane highway.

Major intersections

References

293
Transportation in Overton County, Tennessee